Wang Hui (Yangzhou, 10 October 1959) is a professor in the Department of Chinese Language and Literature, Tsinghua University, Beijing. His researches focus on contemporary Chinese literature and intellectual history. He was the executive editor (with Huang Ping) of the influential magazine Dushu (读书, Reading) from May 1996 to July 2007. The US magazine Foreign Policy named him as one of the top 100 public intellectuals in the world in May 2008. Wang Hui has been Visiting Professor at Harvard, Edinburgh, Bologna (Italy), Stanford, UCLA, Berkeley, and the University of Washington, among others. In March 2010, he appeared as the keynote speaker at the annual meeting for the Association for Asian Studies.

Biography
Wang Hui was born in Yangzhou, Jiangsu, in 10 October 1959. After finishing high school in Yangzhou, Wang Hui worked for two years as a factory worker before entering college. He completed his undergraduate studies at Yangzhou University (then Yangzhou Normal College), and then graduate studies at Nanjing University and the Chinese Academy of Social Sciences, where he received his Ph.D. in 1988.

Wang Hui was a participant in the 1989 Tiananmen Square protests. He was investigated about his involvement, but nothing significant or serious was found. He was later sent to "re-education" (“锻炼”, not to be confused with Re-education through labor “劳动教养”) in Shangluo, Shaanxi, for one year. He has been called the leader of the New Left, although Wang Hui has refused this label:

Work
Professor Wang has authored dozens of books, articles, and public statements on the scholarly and socio-political issues of the day. A representative portion of his work has been translated into English and other languages.

Wang Hui’s monographs include, in Chinese: 
 From An Asian Perspective: The Narrations of Chinese History (《亞洲視野：中國歷史的敘述》, 2010); 
For Alternative Voices (《別求新聲》, 2009); 
 Depoliticized Politics (《去政治化的政治》, 2008); 
 The Rise of Modern Chinese Thought (four volumes), (《現代中國思想的興起》, 2004–2009); and 
 Rekindling Frozen Fire: The Paradox of Modernity (《死火重溫》, 2000). 
His books, translated into English, include: 
 The Rise of Modern Chinese Thought (four volumes), in press; 
 The End of Revolution: China and the Limits of Modernity (Verso, 2010); 
 China’s New Order: Society, Politics, and Economy in Transition, translated by Ted Huters and Rebecca Karl (Harvard University Press, 2003); 
 Shisō kūkan toshite no gendai chūgoku (Modern China as a Space for Thinking), translated by Murata Yujiro, Sunayama Yukio, and Onodera Shiro (Tokyo: Iwanami Shoten, 2006); 
 A New Asian Imagination (in Korean; Seoul: Creation and Criticism Press, 2003); and 
 The Politics of Imagining Asia, translated by Theodore Huters, (Harvard University Press, 2011);
 China's Twentieth Century: Revolution, Retreat and the Road to Equality, edited by Saul Thomas, numerous translators, (First published by Verso, 2016).

Controversies

Cheung Kong Dushu Prize

Wang Hui was involved in the controversy following the results of the Cheung Kong Dushu Prize (长江读书奖) in 2000. The prize was set up by Sir Ka-shing Li, which awards one million RMB in total to be shared by the winners. The 3 recipients of the prize in 2000 were Wang Hui, who served as the coordinator of the academic selection committee of the prize, Fei Xiaotong, the Honorary Chairman of the committee, and Qian Liqun, another committee member. Wang Hui was then the editor-in-chief of Dushu magazine, which was the administrative body of the prize.

Allegations of plagiarism

Wang Binbin, a professor of literature from Nanjing University, accused Wang Hui of plagiarism, citing what he deemed to be improper use of footnote protocols and incorrectly cited passages in Wang’s doctoral dissertation on Lu Xun 《反抗绝望》 (Against Despair). Wang Binbin's accusation was first published on an academic journal, and reappeared on Southern Weekly on March 25, 2010. Professor Wang Binbin further suggested that Wang Hui, in his The Rise of Modern Chinese Thought, may have used R. G. Collingwood's canonical book, The Idea of History, with or without proper citations.

Apart from Wang Binbin's findings, an analysis of Wang Hui's weak use of footnotes by Xiang Yihua, a researcher with the Zhejiang Academy of Social Sciences, revealed other sections incorporating sources without citation. He also published a review of Wang Hui's essay 《“赛先生”在中国的命运》 (English translation: "The Fate of 'Mr. Science' in China"), questioning the originality of his research.

Online commentators found some paragraphs in Against Despair to be copied verbatim from other sources. Authors such as M. B. Khrapchenko and F. C. Copleston were used without acknowledgment to either the original works or their translations.

Some scholars are concerned over the plagiarism accusations. Prof. Lin Yu-sheng (Emeritus, University of Wisconsin-Madison) says that some of the plagiarism charges are sustained, which is concurred by Prof. Yu Ying-shih. An open letter signed by more than 60 scholars called for the Chinese Academy of Social Sciences and Tsinghua University to investigate the plagiarism case.

Some international scholars and weblog authors have come to Wang's defense, noting that this is mostly a case of sloppy citation practice, not actual plagiarism. A letter signed by 96 scholars, addressed to the authority of Tsinghua University, endorsing Wang Hui's scholarly integrity was made public on 9 July. Most of the passages highlighted by Wang Binbin did actually have citations to the original works, asking readers to "consult" those works. It is argued that there is no attempt by Wang Hui to hide the sources of the sections in question, even if the citations were, at times, nonstandard.

Republication and censorship of CAS articles
On October 25, 2017, the director and the editors of the journal Critical Asian Studies issued a statement in regard to the republication and censorship of two articles from the journal without either the authors' or the publisher's permission. The two articles are Claudia Pozzana and Alessandro Russo's "China's New Order and Past Disorders: A Dialogue Starting from Wang Hui's Analysis" (2006), and their "Continuity/Discontinuity: China's Place in the Contemporary World" (2011). According to the statement, the 2006 article was censored and republished in a Chinese journal edited by Wang Hui himself in 2015, and the 2011 article was republished in 2014, unauthorized. In the censored republications, passages concerning Tiananmen Square protests of 1989 were deleted.

See also
New Left in China
"Contemporary Chinese Thought and the Question of Modernity", a major 1997 article by Wang

References

External links
Wang Hui: Depoliticized Politics, From East to West

1959 births
Living people
Chinese New Left
Academic staff of Tsinghua University
Nanjing University alumni
People involved in plagiarism controversies
21st-century Chinese philosophers
Chinese political philosophers
Chinese sinologists
Chinese Academy of Social Sciences alumni